Old Town Township may refer to the following townships in the United States:

 Old Town Township, McLean County, Illinois
 Old Town Township, Forsyth County, North Carolina